Tiksi North is a former Russian military airfield located 41 km north of Tiksi in Bulunsky District, Sakha Republic. Described as a ghost airfield, its probable use was either as a diversion or dispersal airfield for Soviet bombers. It was likely abandoned sometime in the early 1960s.

See also
Other abandoned arctic staging bases:
 Chekurovka
 Dresba
 Ostrov Bolshevik
 Tiksi West

References

Soviet Long Range Aviation Arctic staging bases
Populated places of Arctic Russia